Saint Rusticus (c. 455 – 25 April 501), the successor of Saint Lupicinus of Lyon (491-494), served as Archbishop of Lyon from 494 to April 501. Later canonized and venerated in the Catholic Church, his feast day is 25 April.

Family
He and his brother St. Viventiolus were the sons of Aquilinus (c. 430-c. 470), a nobleman at Lyon. Aquilinus was the son of Tullia (born 410), the daughter of Saint Eucherius and his wife Gallia. Tullia's husband, whose name is unknown, was the son of Decimus Rusticus and his wife Artemia, and was a vicarius of a province in Gaul between 423 and 448 under Apollinaris, the father of Aquilinus' schoolfellow and friend, Sidonius Apollinaris (c. 400).

Bishop
Rusticus served for many years as a magistrate. Around 494 he succeeded Lupicinus of Lyon as bishop. Shortly after his consecration, Rusticus sent some financial aid to Pope Gelasius I. Gelasius wrote back in February 494, recommending to the bishop's good offices Epiphanius of Pavia, who was on his way to Gaul to see to the ransom of certain captives held by the Burgundian king Gundobad. According to Ennodius, among those freed were 400 from Lyon.

Marriage and issue

Married before 480 to Hiberie de Limoges (born c. 460), daughter of Ruricius, Bishop of Limoges (then Augustoritum) and his wife Ommance. Rusticus and his wife had three children:
 St. Sacerdos, Archbishop of Lyon 
 Leontius, Archbishop of Lyon
 Artemia, the wife of Florentinus, born in 485, a Senator, who were the parents of:
 Gondulf of Provence, Duke, Bishop of Metz
 Arthemia, wife of Munderic Vitrey, Pretender of Austrasia
 St. Nicetius, Archbishop of Lyon

References

Sources
Sidonius Apollinaris, The Letters of Sidonius (Oxford: Clarendon, 1915) (orig.), pp. clx-clxxxiii; List of Correspondents, Notes, V.ix.1.

450s births
501 deaths
Year of birth uncertain
5th-century Frankish bishops
Archbishops of Lyon
Gallo-Roman saints
6th-century Frankish bishops
5th-century archbishops
6th-century Christian saints
Pippinids